Savanna School District is an elementary school district in Anaheim, California that also serves a small portion of Buena Park, Cypress and Stanton.  The district has four schools, Cerritos Elementary, Hansen Elementary, Holder Elementary and Twila Reid Elementary.  All schools are K-6.  The district feeds into the Anaheim Union High School District.  The district's name is a survival from the former town of Savanna, California.

References

External links
 

School districts in Orange County, California
Education in Anaheim, California